Sir Edward Green, 1st Baronet (4 March 1831 – 30 March 1923) was an English ironmaster and a Conservative politician who sat in the House of Commons between 1885 and 1892.

Green was the son of Edward Green (engineer), a Yorkshire ironmaster who founded E. Green & Son based in Wakefield and patented "Green's Economiser". This was a device for recycling heat from boilers that previously went to waste.

Green was educated at West Riding Proprietary School and in Germany, and became an engineer in his father's business. He served in the 1st West Yorkshire Yeomanry as a lieutenant and later captain. In 1865 he and his wife leased Heath Old Hall, an Elizabethan House near Wakefield which they set about developing and furnishing. In 1877 Green purchased the Snettisham Estate in North West Norfolk, and built a new house, Ken Hill, primarily as a shooting lodge. Green became a director of the Lancashire and Yorkshire Railway and was a JP for the West Riding of Yorkshire and for Norfolk. Between 1874 and 1878, Green was a Governor of Wakefield Grammar School.
      
At the 1874 general election Green was elected as Member of Parliament (MP) for Wakefield, but he was unseated on petition. In 1880 he stood in Pontefract, but was not elected. He returned to Wakefield at a by-election in July 1885, and won the seat, holding it until he stood down from the House of Commons at the 1892 general election. On 5 March 1886 he was created a Baronet 'of Wakefield and Ken Hill'.

Green married Mary Lycett , daughter of William Edward Lycett
of Bowdon, Cheshire in 1859, introducing the name Lycett into the family. Lady Green died in King's Lynn on 7 November 1902, in her 67th year. Their eldest son Edward Lycett Green achieved a certain amount of notoriety as he was involved in the Royal Baccarat Scandal in 1890. Edward succeeded to the baronetcy on the death of his father.

His great-grandson is the fashion designer Rupert Lycett Green.

References

Present day company successor to E. Green & Son. History

External links 
 

1831 births
1923 deaths
English businesspeople
Queen's Own Yorkshire Dragoons officers
Baronets in the Baronetage of the United Kingdom
Conservative Party (UK) MPs for English constituencies
UK MPs 1885–1886
UK MPs 1886–1892
Politics of Wakefield